Germany competed at the Eurovision Song Contest 1969, held in Madrid, Spain. ARD, the German broadcaster, used a national final to select their entry.

Ein Lied für Madrid (A Song for Madrid) was held on 22 February at the HR studios in Frankfurt, hosted by Marie-Louise Steibauer. Three artists competing to represent Germany at Eurovision: Peggy March, Rex Gildo and Siw Malmkvist.

The winner of the contest was Swedish artist Siw Malmkvist, with the song "Primaballerina".

Before Eurovision

Ein Lied für Madrid

The GEMA has chosen 30 popular composers and lyricists. These were invited by broadcaster HR to submit one or two songs each. Nine of these songs would participate in the national final. Three singers were chosen to participate in the national final: Siw Malmkvist, who had already represented Sweden in the Eurovision Song Contest 1960, Rex Gildo and Peggy March. All of them were well-known artists in Germany. It is rumoured that actually twelve songs were supposed to be presented and that Alexandra would have been the fourth representative but that she has withdrawn from the competition because Udo Jürgens advised her to do so. However, this has never been confirmed. She later died in July 1969 in a car accident.

The national final
The national final was held at Frankfurt in the HR studios hosted by Marie-Louise Steinbauer on 22 February 1969. The nine songs were presented in three rounds, with each of three singer performing one song in every round. After every round, the stage was re-decorated. During the show, that host has highlighted various times that the national final is supposed to be a song contest and that it is not the artists who is voted for.

The winner was chosen in two rounds of voting by a jury of eleven people including composed of deputies of the ARD and an association of composers and lyricist as well as a conductor. In the first round of voting, the best song of each artist was chosen; every jury member could give one point to his favourite song out of the three. The three chosen songs were sung again before the jury members could give one point to their favourite. Siw Malkvist one with seven points, Peggy March got four and Rex Gildo got no points at all.

The interval act was performed by Rudolf and Mechthild Trautz, European Champions in Latin dancing between 1966 and 1977, who performed a medley of all five international Latin dances (rhumba, samba, cha cha cha, paso doble and jive).

28% of the Germans watched the show making it the second most popular program of the evening. However, an evaluation after the show revealed that many people turned off the program during the live broadcast.

Chart successes
Only two of the songs in the national final were recorded - the winning song, of course and the song Hey by Peggy March. Both were released as singles and reached the German single charts.

At Eurovision
At the Eurovision Song Contest, "Primaballerina" would be the third German entry composed by Hans Blum (he had previously written "Paradies, wo bist du?" in 1965 and "Anouschka" in 1967). Malkvist was the first female singer for Germany who wore trousers on stage rather than a dress.

Voting
Every country had a jury of ten people. Every jury member could give one point to his or her favourite song.

Siw Malkvist received eight points in total and she finished ninth among the 16 contestants. The highest mark came from the Yugoslav jury, which was the first one to vote and gave three points to Germany putting the country in the lead. Surprisingly, she received no points from her home country Sweden. The German jury gave points to three of the four winners (Spain, United Kingdom, Netherlands and France), only the Dutch entry got no points. It was the second of only four times, Germany gave no points to a winner (the other times being in 1966, 1979 and 2011). For the second year in a row, the highest vote went to Spain.

Sources and external links
Jan Feddersen: Ein Lied kann eine Brücke sein, Hoffmann und Campe 2002
Recording of the national final
The 1969 national final on eurovision.de

References

1969
Countries in the Eurovision Song Contest 1969
Eurovision